This is a complete list, in alphabetical order, of cricketers who played for Sheffield Cricket Club in first-class cricket matches. Sheffield sides had played Nottingham Cricket Club from 1771 and Sheffield is classified by recognised sources as a top-class team from 1827 to 1854. A Sheffield side played under the name Yorkshire against Norfolk in 1833 and early Yorkshire sides often had Sheffield players as their core. Sheffield United Cricket Club was formed in the city in 1854, bringing together seven teams under one name and leading to the formation of Sheffield United F.C.

Note that many players represented other teams besides Sheffield and that several played for the county club in or after 1863. A Sheffield and Leicester side played three matches in 1826, one of which has been given first-class status. These players are not recorded in this list.

B

C

D

E

F

G

H

J

K

M

P

R

S

T

V

W

Notes

References

Sheffield
Cricketers